Donald R. Hickey (born 1944) is an American academic who is professor of history at Wayne State College, author and lecturer on early American history, mostly involving the War of 1812.  He has been with Wayne State since 1978 while simultaneously acting as visiting professor at the Army Staff College (1991–1992), the Naval War College (1995–1996), and The Citadel (2013). Hickey has written many articles for numerous historical journals and magazines, and has served on the editorial and advisory boards of several. During his academic career, Hickey has earned a number of awards for his scholarship and literary efforts.

Early life and education
Hickey was born in Illinois in 1944. He earned his B.A., M.A. and Ph.D. in History at the University of Illinois, located in Urbana-Champaign.

Career
Hickey is an expert concerning the War of 1812 and was acclaimed to be "the dean of 1812 scholarship" by The New Yorker magazine; he wrote eight books on the War of 1812, along with numerous articles on the same subject in the Journal of the War of 1812, War of 1812 Magazine, Journal of American History and William and Mary Quarterly.  Hickey's 1989 work, War of 1812, the Forgotten Conflict, has been referred to as "the definitive study" on that war, and one which has "dominated the American interpretation of the War of 1812 to date." His works on the War of 1812 have been referenced in books and journals by other contemporary historians. Hickey  has been noted for gathering hitherto scattered information concerning battlefield casualties in his work, Don't Give up the Ship.

From 1978 to 1986 Hickey was the editor of A Journal of the History and Culture of the Missouri Valley. Since 2007 he has served as press editor at Johns Hopkins University Press. In 1991/92 he was a member of the advisory board at the Military Review. In 1993 to 1997 he was a member of the editorial board at the Journal of the Early Republic. Since 2002 he has been a member of the board of advisors at the Journal of the War of 1812. Since 2006 Hickey has been a War of 1812 Magazine editorial board member.

Hickey has authored eleven books and over a hundred journal articles, mostly involving the  War of 1812. He has lectured across the United States, Canada, and the British Isles. He often worked and consulted with several governmental agencies and museums.

In his definitive work, War of 1812, the Forgotten Conflict, Hickey challenges the contemporary consensus for the necessity of the war. His focus is on maritime issues rather than westward expansion in the north west theater. In scholarly reviews of this work, Hickey is said to be sympathetic to the Federalists who opposed the war, while he tends to fault President James Madison, questions his ability to lead, and harbors a measure of hostility towards the Republicans for promoting a war he feels was not necessary at that time.

In 2022 on the History Hit America podcast he incorrectly claimed that the Battle of Trafalgar was fought in 1804.

Honors and awards
Hickey has earned various awards for his historical scholarship efforts.

 Best Book Award in 1990 for his work, The War of 1812: A Forgotten Conflict, from the American Military Institute's
 National Historical Society Book Prize, 1990 for The War of 1812: A Forgotten Conflict.
 Burlington Northern Award, 1991 for outstanding teaching
 Commander's Award, 1992-1993, for Public Service,  U.S. Army Command and General Staff College
 Pi Gamma Mu , Outstanding Faculty Member award  
 Burlington Northern Award, 1993 for outstanding scholarship
 Maryland Preservation Award, 2013, Excellence in Media & Publications award
 Spirit of 1812 Award, 2013, from the National Society United States Daughters of 1812
 Samuel Eliot Morison Award, 2013, from the USS Constitution Museum
 Nebraska 150 Books honor, 2017, for his work, Nebraska Moments
 NEH Research Fellowship for College Teachers, 1988.
 The History Book Club selected his work, War of 1812: A Forgotten Conflict, for book club edition.
 Speaker at the 1987 meeting of the American Historical Association.

Publications
 
 
 
 
 
 
 
 
 

Journals

See also
Bibliography of the War of 1812

Notes

Citations

Bibliography

External links
 Photo of Donald Hickey at Wayne State College
 Hickey interview

1944 births
Living people
American historians
War of 1812 books
Wayne State College faculty
University of Illinois Urbana-Champaign alumni